Darius Nggawa (1 May 1929 – 9 January 2008) was an Indonesian Roman Catholic bishop.

Ordained to the priesthood on 12 October 1955, Nggawa was named bishop of Roman Catholic Diocese of Larantuka, Indonesia on 28 February 1974 and retired on 19 June 2004.

References 

1929 births
2008 deaths
People from East Nusa Tenggara
20th-century Roman Catholic bishops in Indonesia